The 2018 BetVictor World Matchplay was the 25th annual staging of the World Matchplay, organised by the Professional Darts Corporation. The tournament took place at the Winter Gardens, Blackpool, from 21–29 July 2018.

Phil Taylor was the defending champion, after defeating Peter Wright 18–8 in the 2017 final to claim his 16th World Matchplay title, but he retired following the 2018 PDC World Darts Championship final. For the first time, the winner of the tournament, (Gary Anderson) received the Phil Taylor Trophy, which was renamed in his honour in January 2018.

Gary Anderson hit a nine dart finish in the fourth leg of his quarter-final match against Joe Cullen, which was the seventh nine-dart finish in the World Matchplay and the first since 2014. Anderson overcame Cullen 19–17, facing two match darts against him at 14–15 scoreline.

Anderson went on to win his first World Matchplay title, defeating Mensur Suljović, 21–19 after extra time in the longest final in the tournament's history.

The first round match between Kim Huybrechts and John Henderson made a piece of World Matchplay history, as it was the first time that a match was won by a single leg since the 1997 3rd place play-off. Huybrechts won the match 13–12 in a sudden-death leg, the first time the rule had been needed since it was introduced in 2013. 

For the first time in World Matchplay history, no Englishmen progressed into the semi-finals, resulting in a first Matchplay final without an English player.

Prize money
The prize fund remained at £500,000, with the winner's earnings being £115,000. Gary Anderson received £45,000 for hitting a nine-dart finish in his quarter-final against Joe Cullen.

Format
In previous stagings of the event all games had to be won by two clear legs with no sudden-death legs. However, after consulting the host broadcaster Sky Sports in 2013, the PDC decided that games will now only proceed for a maximum of six extra legs before a tie-break leg is required. For example, in a best of 19 legs first round match, if the score reaches 12–12 then the 25th leg will be the decider.

Qualification
The top 16 players on the PDC Order of Merit as of 2 July 2018 were seeded for the tournament. The top 16 players on the ProTour Order of Merit not to have already qualified were unseeded.

The following players qualified for the tournament:

PDC Order of Merit Top 16
  Michael van Gerwen (first round)
  Peter Wright (semi-finals)
  Rob Cross (second round)
  Gary Anderson (champion)'  Daryl Gurney (second round)  Mensur Suljović (runner-up)  Simon Whitlock (quarter-finals)  Dave Chisnall (quarter-finals)  Michael Smith (second round)  James Wade (second round)  Ian White (second round)  Gerwyn Price (first round)  Raymond van Barneveld (second round)  Darren Webster (quarter-finals)  Kim Huybrechts (second round)  Adrian Lewis (second round)PDC ProTour qualifiers
  Jonny Clayton (first round)  Joe Cullen (quarter-finals)  Stephen Bunting (first round)  Max Hopp (first round)  Mervyn King (first round)  Jermaine Wattimena (first round)  Steve West (first round)  Steve Beaton (first round)  Kyle Anderson (first round)  James Wilson (first round)  John Henderson (first round)  Keegan Brown (first round)  Jelle Klaasen (first round)  Steve Lennon (first round)  Jeffrey de Zwaan (semi-finals)  Richard North (first round)''

Draw

Statistics
{|class="wikitable sortable" style="font-size: 95%; text-align: right"
|-
! Player
! Eliminated
! Played
! Legs Won
! Legs Lost
! 100+
! 140+
! 180s
! High checkout
! 3-dart average
! Checkout success
|-
|align="left"|  Gary Anderson
| Winner
| 5
| 
| 
| 
| 
| 
| 152
| 100.88
| 36.45%
|-
|align="left"|  Mensur Suljović
| Final
| 5
| 
| 
| 
| 
| 
| 151
| 97.16
| 40.56%
|-
|align="left"| 
| 
| 4
| 
| 
| 
| 
| 
| 140
| 99.12
| 42.86%
|-
|align="left"|  Peter Wright
| Semi-finals
| 4
| 
| 
| 
| 
| 
| 170
| 88.68
| 37.14%
|-
|align="left"|  Dave Chisnall
| 
| 3
| 
| 
| 
| 
| 
| 148
| 99.05
| 47.06%
|-
|align="left"|  Simon Whitlock
| Quarter-finals
| 3
| 
| 
| 
| 
| 
| 132
| 96.14
| 38.46%
|-
|align="left"|  Darren Webster
| Quarter-finals
| 3
| 
| 
| 
| 
| 
| 138
| 95.70
| 41.67%
|-
|align="left"|  Joe Cullen
| Quarter-finals
| 3
| 
| 
| 
| 
| 
| 170
| 95.26
| 41.46%
|-
|align="left"|  Adrian Lewis
| Second round
| 2
| 
| 
| 
| 
| 
| 121
| 103.86
| 40.91%
|-
|align="left"|  Rob Cross
| 
| 2
| 
| 
| 
| 
| 
| 156
| 98.81
| 27.59%
|-
|align="left"|  Michael Smith
|Second round
| 2
| 
| 
| 
| 
| 
| 110
| 98.11
| 40.00%
|-
|align="left"|  Kim Huybrechts
|Second round
| 2
| 
| 
| 
| 
| 
| 156
| 96.16
| 33.33%
|-
|align="left"| 
| Second round
| 2
| 
| 
| 
| 
| 
| 130
| 95.29
| 69.23%
|-
|align="left"|  Ian White
|Second round
| 2
| 
| 
| 
| 
| 
| 154
| 93.51
| 50.00%
|-
|align="left"|  James Wade
|Second round
| 2
| 
| 
| 
| 
| 
| 149
| 90.88
| 24.14%
|-
|align="left"|  Daryl Gurney
|Second round
| 2
| 
| 
| 
| 
| 
| 100
| 87.69
| 25.00%
|-
|align="left"| 
|
| 1
| 6
| 10
| 16
| 8
| 6
| 100
| 97.88
| 35.29%
|-
|align="left"|  Mervyn King
|First round
| 1
| 5
| 10
| 15
| 9
| 5
| 72
| 91.85
| 41.67%
|-
|align="left"|  Steve West
|First round
| 1
| 10
| 12
| 23
| 18
| 6
| 108
| 91.79
| 31.25%
|-
|align="left"|  John Henderson
|First round
| 1
| 12
| 13
| 30
| 13
| 3
| 114
| 91.00
| 52.17%
|-
|align="left"|  Steve Lennon
|First round
| 1
| 6
| 10
| 24
| 10
| 2
| 124
| 91.00
| 37.50%
|-
|align="left"|  Steve Beaton
|First round
| 1
| 6
| 10
| 24
| 11
| 1
| 120
| 90.92
| 46.15%
|-
|align="left"|  Kyle Anderson
|First round
| 1
| 6
| 10
| 14
| 9
| 5
| 90
| 90.69
| 33.33%
|-
|align="left"|  Max Hopp
|First round
| 1
| 7
| 10
| 23
| 16
| 1
| 80
| 90.51
| 46.67%
|-
|align="left"|  Gerwyn Price
|First round
| 1
| 3
| 10
| 8
| 5
| 5
| 99
| 90.23
| 23.08%
|-
|align="left"|  James Wilson
|First round
| 1
| 8
| 10
| 19
| 12
| 2
| 86
| 87.72
| 44.44%
|-
|align="left"|  Jermaine Wattimena
|First round
| 1
| 10
| 12
| 24
| 16
| 1
| 113
| 87.63
| 29.41%
|-
|align="left"|  Stephen Bunting
|First round
| 1
| 7
| 10
| 8
| 11
| 3
| 110
| 86.21
| 46.67%
|-
|align="left"|  Jelle Klaasen
|First round
| 1
| 5
| 10
| 13
| 7
| 1
| 40
| 84.36
| 31.25%
|-
|align="left"|  Jonny Clayton
|First round
| 1
| 6
| 10
| 15
| 8
| 3
| 154
| 84.06
| 54.55%
|-
|align="left"|  Richard North
|First round
| 1
| 2
| 10
| 8
| 10
| 1
| 80
| 80.40
| 50.00%
|-
|align="left"|  Keegan Brown
|First round
| 1
| 4
| 10
| 14
| 3
| 1
| 109
| 76.62
| 33.33%
|-

References 

World Matchplay (darts)
World Matchplay
World Matchplay
World Matchplay